Peculator is a genus of sea snails, marine gastropod molluscs in the family Volutomitridae, one family of mitres.

Species
Species within the genus Peculator include:
 Peculator baccatus Cernohorsky, 1980
 Peculator hedleyi (Murdoch, 1905)
 Peculator obconicus (Powell, 1952)
 Peculator porphyria (Verco, 1896)
 Peculator verconis Iredale, 1924

References

 Powell A. W. B., New Zealand Mollusca, William Collins Publishers Ltd, Auckland, New Zealand 1979 
 Y. Kantor, 2010, Checklist of Recent Volutomitridae
 GBIF

Volutomitridae
Extant Miocene first appearances